Zaratosht-nama or Cangranghaca-nama is a religious epic poem in Persian language composed in 13th century CE. The poem is about the life of Zoroaster, the founder of Zoroastianism. The author of the poem is Kay Kavus pur-i Khosrow. The poem is erroneously attributed to Zartosht Bahram-e Pazhdo who is actually the copier of the first surviving manuscript of the work. The poem contains 600 distichs and is composed in the same meter as Shahnameh of Ferdowsi. The work is based on the oral narratives of Zoroastrians and has a lot of similarities with Middle Persian literature such as the Denkard. Arabic loanwords are not common in the work. It also contains some rare Pahlavi words.

References

Zoroastrianism
Epic poems in Persian
Persian_mythology